Manny Guerra is an American record producer, music engineer, and recording artist, who specializes in Tejano music. Guerra started in the industry playing with Sunny and the Sunglows, recording hit singles such as "Talk to Me", which peaked at number 11 on the United States Billboard Hot 100 and number 12 on the Billboard Hot R&B/Hip-Hop Songs in 1963. His distribution group, Manny Music Inc., is located in San Antonio, Texas, along with his recording studio, AMEN Recording Studios and his record label GP Productions. On August 30, 1992, BMG Music entered a distribution deal with Manny Music Inc., during the 1990s Tejano music golden age. BMG was the third large scale company to enter the Tejano music market after Sony Discos and EMI Latin, respectively. However, in November 1992, BMG and Guerra parted ways due to management style differences. Guerra's AMEN Studios was considered to be one of the most active recording studios in the state of Texas, which utilized MCI equipment.

Guerra has produced a number of artists including, Augustine Ramirez, Jay Perez, Sunny Ozuna, Culturas, Abraham Quintanilla, Jr., and Selena, among others.

References

American musicians of Mexican descent
Hispanic and Latino American musicians
Polka musicians
Musicians from Texas
Tejano musicians
Songwriters from Texas
American drummers
Record producers from Texas